Danny Meddings (born 25 June 1968) is a former English professional squash player.

Meddings was born in Surrey and represented the county. He reached a world ranking of 12 and competed in the British Open Squash Championships throughout the nineties. He represented England at International level.

References

English male squash players
1968 births
Living people